James Edward "Ned" Bryan III (July 11, 1909 – May 10, 2007) was an American librarian, and president of the American Library Association from 1962 to 1963. Bryan was born in Easton, Pennsylvania, to William W. and Florence Shimer Bryan. He received degrees from Lafayette College, Drexel University and American University.

He began his career at the District of Columbia Public Library and was later named Director of the Easton, Pennsylvania, public library. He then moved to Pittsburgh to manage a department in the Carnegie Library of Pittsburgh. Bryan then moved to Newark, New Jersey, to serve first as Assistant Director and in 1958 was named Director of the Newark Public Library. He retired from Newark at age 63 in 1972.

Bryan served as president of the Public Library Association in 1959 and the New Jersey Library Association from 1952 to 1954.

References

 

1909 births
2007 deaths
American librarians
Presidents of the American Library Association
Drexel University alumni
American University alumni
Lafayette College alumni
People from Easton, Pennsylvania
People from Newark, New Jersey